The 1966 Le Mans 6 Hour Race was an endurance race for Sports Cars, Improved Production Touring Cars and Series Production Touring Cars. It was held at the Caversham Circuit in Western Australia on 6 June 1966 over a six-hour duration. The race, which was the twelfth Six Hour Le Mans race, was won by Ron Thorp driving an AC Cobra 289.

Results

24 cars finished the race from a field of 44 starters.

References

Six Hours Le Mans
Le Mans 6 Hour Race